Several ships of the United States Navy have borne some version of the name Roosevelt in honor of members of the Roosevelt family.

 , a  that saw service during World War II. 
 , a patrol vessel in commission from 1918 to 1919, named for President Theodore Roosevelt
She was named for both President Franklin D. Roosevelt and his wife, Eleanor Roosevelt.

Three of the ships have been named USS Theodore Roosevelt, in honor of President Theodore Roosevelt.

 , a steamer built in 1906, acquired by the Navy from the Roosevelt Steamship Company sometime in 1918 and fitted out as a troop transport. 
 , a  ballistic missile submarine, launched in 1959 and stricken in 1982.
 , a  launched in 1984 and currently in active service

United States Navy ship names